Discussion page may refer to:
a type of page on a wiki
a page of an Internet forum

See also
Conversation (disambiguation)
Debate (disambiguation)